Henri Désiré Landru (12 April 1869 – 25 February 1922) was a French serial killer, nicknamed the Bluebeard of Gambais. He murdered at least seven women in the village of Gambais between December 1915 and January 1919. Landru also killed at least three other women and a young man in the house he rented from December 1914 to August 1915 in the town of Vernouillet, 35 km northwest of Paris. The true number of Landru's victims is suspected to be higher.

Landru was arrested on 12 April 1919 at an apartment near Paris's Gare du Nord, which he shared with his 24-year-old mistress, Fernande Segret. The police eventually concluded that Landru had met or been in romantic correspondence with 283 women during the First World War, including 72 who were never traced. In December 1919, Landru's wife Marie-Catherine, 51, and his eldest son Maurice, 25, were arrested on suspicion of complicity in Landru's thefts from his victims. Both denied any knowledge of Landru's criminal activities. Marie-Catherine was released without charge in July 1920 due to health reasons, on the same day that Maurice was released because the authorities could not establish his guilt.

Landru continued to protest his complete innocence during an investigation that lasted more than a year. He was finally charged with the murders at Vernouillet and Gambais of ten women and the teenage son of his first victim. Landru's trial in November 1921 at Versailles was attended by leading French celebrities, including the novelist Colette and the actor and singer Maurice Chevalier. On 30 November, Landru was found guilty by a majority verdict of all eleven murders and sentenced to death. He was executed by guillotine on 25 February 1922.

Early life and career (1869–1914) 

Henri Landru was born in Paris, the son of a furnace stoker and a laundress, who were both ardent Catholics. He was educated by monks at a Catholic school on the Île Saint-Louis, serving as an altar boy at the adjacent church, where his parents and elder sister worshiped. By his late teens, Landru had graduated to sub-deacon, a secular post that involved lighting candles and helping a priest with his vestments. According to his future wife Marie-Catherine, she first set eyes on the young Landru at Mass one Sunday in 1887. "We got talking as we were leaving the church and so my love story began."

Landru and Marie-Catherine's first child, Marie, was born illegitimately in 1891, shortly after Landru began three years' obligatory military service in the northern French town of Saint-Quentin, rising from private to the position of deputy quartermaster. In the autumn of 1893, he returned to Paris and married Marie-Catherine, who was already pregnant with their second child, Maurice. The couple had two more children: Suzanne, born in 1896, and Charles, born in 1900. 

During the 1890s while his wife worked as a laundress, Landru drifted from one job to the next. He was employed for short periods in Paris as a plumber's accountant, a furniture salesman and an assistant to a toy maker. In a later newspaper interview, Marie-Catherine described Landru as a "model husband" and father in the early years of their marriage, even though she also told police that he was a "skirt chaser" from the very beginning.

Landru's drift into crime and possible insanity seems to have been associated with his ambition to become a famous inventor. In 1898 he designed a primitive motorbike, which he called "The Landru", and then deceived several potential investors into giving him money to build a factory to manufacture it. Having pocketed the money, Landru vanished. Other projects that Landru began in the late 1890s and early 1900s included a plan for a new suburban railway line west of Paris and an automated children's toy. Meanwhile, he was constantly on the run from the police, seeing little of his family and lying low for a year in Le Havre.

In 1904 Landru was finally arrested in Paris after falling in the street, as he was running away from a bank he had tried to defraud. He was remanded in custody at the Santé prison where he made what appears to have been a fake suicide attempt, slipping his head through a noose made from his bed sheet just as a guard was entering his cell. Landru was examined by Dr Charles Vallon, one of France's leading criminal psychiatrists, who concluded that Landru was "on the frontiers of madness" but was not yet insane and was still responsible for his actions. Vallon's diagnosis was confirmed by two other psychiatrists. Yet Vallon was sufficiently concerned by Landru's behavior that he warned Marie-Catherine to be on guard in the future.

Landru was tried and sentenced to two years in jail in the town of Fresnes, south of Paris. He was in and out of prison for the next decade. During this period, Landru's wife and four children lived in a series of cheap rented apartments in and around Paris. In 1909 Landru attempted to swindle an affluent widow in the northern city of Lille by posing as a wealthy, single businessman and persuading her to hand over her savings in a pre-marital contract. He was arrested while trying to cash in her investment certificates and sentenced to three years in prison at Loos, near Lille. While he was in jail, his widowed father committed suicide in April 1912 by hanging himself from a tree in the Bois de Boulogne. Landru's wife subsequently claimed that her father-in-law had killed himself partly in despair at her husband's criminal career. She also said that in the autumn of 1912, as soon as he was released from prison, Landru stole around 12,000 francs (approximately $40,000 in modern money) that his father had pointedly left her and the four children, rather than him.

In the winter of 1913–14, Landru executed easily the most successful swindle of his career, duping more than a dozen individuals into giving him a total of 35,600 francs to "invest" in building a fictitious automobile factory. He went on the run in April 1914 with all this money, plus most of his father's inheritance, just before the police came to arrest him. In late July 1914 he was tried and convicted in absentia for the fraud. Taking his previous convictions into account, the court sentenced Landru to four years of hard labor followed by exile for life on the French Pacific island of New Caledonia.

Murders (1915–1919)

Jeanne and André Cuchet (January or February 1915) 
Landru had escaped to a village near the town of Chantilly, 50 km north of Paris, in the company of Jeanne Cuchet, a pretty, 39-year-old Parisian seamstress who had been widowed in 1909. She knew him at this stage as "Raymond Diard", an industrialist from northern France, who had promised to marry her and had persuaded her to give up her job making lingerie for a dress shop in Paris. Cuchet appears to have hoped that Landru, alias Diard, would provide a respectable home for her and her only son André, 17, who was illegitimate.

The balance of Cuchet's relationship with Landru changed completely in early August 1914 when Germany declared war on France. Landru failed to make a rendezvous with Cuchet, who had returned to Paris to be with André, still living in her old apartment. In despair, Cuchet went back to the house near Chantilly, accompanied by André and her brother-in-law, hoping to find the man she still knew as "Diard". The house was empty, but she found Landru's identity papers inside a chest, along with various fake documents. The next day, Cuchet visited Landru's abandoned apartment in southern Paris where she discovered that he was a criminal on the run who should have been deported to New Caledonia.

Cuchet insisted to her sister and brother-in-law that her engagement with Landru was over, but when he reappeared in late August 1914 she resumed their relationship. Meanwhile, she kept a close watch on her patriotic son André, who was desperate to join the army and fight the Germans, even though he was too young to volunteer. In late November 1914, Cuchet suddenly pulled André out of his job at an automobile factory in northwest Paris. At the start of December, Cuchet, Landru (posing as "Monsieur Cuchet") and André moved to a house in Vernouillet, a small town by the Seine, 35 km northwest of Paris. Over Christmas, Cuchet wrote to a woman friend in Paris, explaining that it would not be convenient to visit her in Vernouillet because of the poor weather: "at the moment the place is rather muddy". In mid-January, André learned to his joy that his scheduled recruitment to the army had been brought forward two years to the summer of 1915. He wrote to a friend in the army on 20 January, reporting his good news, and another to an uncle a week later. Then Cuchet and André disappeared without a trace. No one ever saw them again.

Subsequent murders (June 1915 – January 1919) 
Landru's subsequent murders between 1915 and 1919 were presented chronologically at his trial, creating the false impression that he had met the women in the order in which he killed them. In fact, one of his known victims had been "engaged" to the married Landru for more than two years before he murdered her, a period during which he killed at least five other women; another victim had known him for more than a year and a half before she disappeared; while his last known victim, a prostitute, may have first encountered Landru as early as 1914.

It was also taken for granted by the police and the prosecution that he had recorded the total number of his victims in a list of 11 names and code-names he had written at the back of a little black notebook (known in French as a carnet) which was discovered immediately after his arrest. This is questionable for several reasons. Landru did not acquire the carnet until the spring of 1915, more than a year after he first met Jeanne Cuchet, his first known victim. He did not begin to keep detailed notes in the carnet until the summer of 1916, and even then, statements by various witnesses proved beyond doubt that Landru did not record all his planned and impromptu encounters with women in the later years of the war. Landru claimed at his trial that the list was simply an aide-mémoire to remind him of clients from whom he had bought furniture as a second-hand dealer. He was certainly lying, but based on witness testimony and forensic evidence, it is also almost certain that other unknown victims were not recorded by Landru on the list.

Landru's nine known victims after Jeanne and André Cuchet all lived in Paris. In order of the presumed date of their murder, they were:

Thérèse Laborde-Line, 46 (Vernouillet, June 1915)

Born in Argentina, Thérèse Laborde-Line was a divorced, unemployed widow who was estranged from her only son, a postal clerk, and her daughter-in-law. She met Landru either through a lonely-hearts advertisement he placed on 1 May 1915 in Le Journal, a mass circulation daily, or through a notice applying for a position as a lady's companion which she placed in another newspaper.

Marie-Angélique Guillin, 52 (Vernouillet, August 1915) 
She was a widowed, retired housekeeper, living near Paris's Gare de Lyon, who had inherited a substantial sum from her last employer. Guillin answered Landru's 1 May 1915 lonely-hearts advertisement and believed his story about being the next Consul-General to Australia, in need of a wife to host diplomatic receptions.

Berthe Héon, 55 (Gambais, December 1915) 
Originally from Le Havre, Berthe Héon scraped a living as a cleaning woman and had suffered multiple bereavements, losing in turn her husband, her long-term lover, her two legitimate children and her beloved illegitimate daughter in childbirth. She met Landru in the summer of 1915, probably via a second lonely-hearts advertisement he placed in Le Journal. Posing as a businessman, Landru pretended he was in search of a wife to join him in the "pretty colony" of Tunisia.

Anna Collomb, 44 (Gambais, December 1916) 
Anna Collomb was a clever, attractive widow who worked as a typist at an insurance company in Paris and had had a string of lovers since the death of her alcoholic, bankrupt husband a decade earlier. Her motive for answering Landru's 1 May 1915 lonely-hearts advertisement was probably that she wanted a stepfather for her illegitimate young daughter, whom she had reportedly placed in the care of nuns in Italy. The little girl was never traced by the police.

Andrée Babelay, 19 (Gambais, April 1917) 
Chatty and vivacious, Andrée Babelay was a nanny and possible casual prostitute whom Landru picked up one evening while riding on the Paris metro. Babelay spent the next ten days living with Landru (whom she called 'Lulu') in a room he rented near Paris's Gare du Nord, and then a further fortnight at his rented house near Gambais, where she was seen by a local game warden learning to ride a bicycle.

Célestine Buisson, 47 (Gambais, September 1917) 
Homely, trusting and semi-literate, Célestine Buisson was yet another woman who answered Landru's 1 May 1915 lonely-hearts advertisement in Le Journal. Born in southwest France, Buisson was a widow who worked as a housekeeper and was lonely after the mobilization of her only son, who was illegitimate. Landru, alias Georges Frémyet, became "engaged" to Buisson immediately, but then put off their marriage for more than two years, pleading lost identity documents and long "business trips" abroad.

Louise Jaume, 38 (Gambais, November 1917) 

She was a devout Catholic, working as a dress shop assistant, who answered a lonely-hearts advertisement Landru placed in a conservative newspaper after deciding to divorce her estranged husband. Jaume initially refused to sleep with Landru, alias "Lucien Guillet", a refugee from the German-occupied Ardennes region. He broke her resistance and then took her to Gambais on a one-way train ticket after celebrating Mass with her at the basilica of Sacré Cœur in Paris.

Anne-Marie ('Annette') Pascal, 37 (Gambais, April 1918) 
On account of her wide-brimmed hats, Annette Pascal was nicknamed "Mme Sombrero" by her neighbors on the street near the Père Lachaise cemetery where she lived and worked, making dresses for a Paris fashion house. Pascal was divorced and childless, following the death of her only son in infancy, and was looking for a so-called "vieux monsieur" ("sugar daddy") in September 1916 when she spotted Landru's lonely-hearts advertisement in the Paris evening daily, La Presse.

Marie-Thérèse Marchadier, 37 (Gambais, January 1919) 
Born in Bordeaux, Marie-Thérèse Marchadier was a career prostitute and a familiar sight on the street outside her apartment on Paris's Rue Saint-Jacques, where she liked to walk her two beloved Belgian griffon dogs. At Landru's trial, the prosecution claimed that he first met the heavily indebted Marchadier in October 1918 after she advertised to sell her furniture. Circumstantial evidence suggests that he may have encountered her several years earlier in the port of Le Havre or the provincial town of Beauvais.

Pursuit and arrest 
Landru was able to avoid capture during the war for three principal reasons. One was the war itself, which denuded France's civilian police force, as officers of military age were mobilized and sent to the front. In Vernouillet, where Landru rented his first house from December 1914 to August 1915, there was just one constable for the whole town. In Gambais, where Landru rented his second house from December 1915 till his arrest, there was one constable in his early seventies, stationed in the village, and a single mounted gendarme in the market town of Houdan, four miles (6.4 km) away.

Secondly, Landru's wife and four children knew his whereabouts throughout the war but shielded him from the police. Landru's youngest son Charles, born in 1900, worked as his self-styled "apprentice", helping Landru remove furniture and other possessions from at least five of his known victims' apartments and latterly acting as his father's chauffeur. His eldest son Maurice, born in 1894, was mobilized in the summer of 1915 and arrested soon afterwards for various frauds and thefts, including the receipt and sale of valuables from Landru that had belonged to his first known victim, Jeanne Cuchet. Following his release from prison, Maurice helped Landru concoct a cover story to explain the disappearance of his sixth known victim, Anna Collomb, to one of Anna's friends. Meanwhile, Landru's wife lived for most of the war in the northwestern Paris suburb of Clichy under the false name "Frémyet" (one of Landru's aliases) in an apartment where he was seen coming and going at regular intervals. Landru's wife forged the signature of his eighth known victim, Célestine Buisson, so he could gain access to Célestine's bank account, and impersonated his ninth known victim, Louise Jaume, for the same purpose.

Lastly, Landru benefited from the indifference of police officers and village officials to the fate of the women, at a time when hundreds of thousands of young men were losing their lives at the front. Indeed, it is arguable that Landru might never have been arrested without the persistence of another woman who forced the authorities to investigate the suspicious man who rented the Villa Tric outside Gambais.

Marie Lacoste's pursuit of Landru 
Marie Lacoste, the younger half-sister of Célestine Buisson, was an unmarried housemaid who disliked Landru, alias George Frémyet, from the moment she first met him at Buisson's apartment in the summer of 1915. Over the next two years, Lacoste began to suspect that Buisson's fiancé was a marriage swindler, out to get his hands on the naive Buisson's savings. Lacoste's suspicion was confirmed during a visit with Buisson to the Villa Tric in August 1917, when Buisson admitted that "Frémyet" had taken charge of her investments. Buisson refused to take Lacoste's advice to end her engagement to "Frémyet" and the two siblings were scarcely on speaking terms when they returned to Paris. A day later, Landru took Buisson back to Gambais, travelling on a one-way train ticket. She was never seen again.

During the autumn of 1917, Landru became increasingly worried that Lacoste might suspect him of Buisson's murder. He tried to reassure Lacoste that her half-sister was still alive by sending her two fake postcards from Gambais, purportedly signed by "Célestine". Lacoste instantly realized the signatures were forgeries, but having concluded that Landru was just a con man, did not take any other action. Still worried, Landru turned up alone on several occasions at Lacoste's workplace to invite her to dinner with Buisson at Buisson's apartment in Paris. Landru knew the apartment was empty and almost certainly intended to kill Lacoste there. Each time, Lacoste refused, eventually telling Landru to get lost and not to come back.

For the next year, Lacoste mentally washed her hands of Buisson, deciding that her half-sister was too ashamed about falling into the clutches of a crook to want any further contact between them. Then in December 1918 Lacoste received a letter which stirred her into action. Buisson's son had been blinded during the war and from his home in southwest France, had tried to contact Buisson to borrow money, following what he called a "serious accident". She had not replied, prompting the son to ask Lacoste if she could intervene with Buisson on his behalf. Lacoste visited Buisson's old apartment, where the concierge told her that Buisson had last been seen there in the summer of 1917 and that at least one other woman had subsequently spent the night at the address with "Frémyet" before he paid off the lease. Thoroughly alarmed, Lacoste concluded that Landru had probably killed Buisson and had been planning to kill her when he invited her to the apartment.

She rapidly compiled a dossier for the police, noting Landru's physical appearance, his known movements with Buisson since 1915, the location and design of his house near Gambais, his thefts from Buisson's bank accounts, the forged postcards after her disappearance and his phony invitations to dinner. On 11 January 1919, Lacoste took her dossier to her local police station in Paris, accompanied by a fellow maid called Laure Bonhoure who had seen Landru when he had visited the house where they worked. At the station, a police officer told Lacoste that she needed to contact the authorities in Gambais, where Buisson had vanished. The next day, Lacoste wrote to the mayor of Gambais in her best formal French, forgetting her full stops as she raced on:

"You have in your commune a house at about 100 meters from the church, which is called the Maison Tric, the name of the owner, I do not know him, but the house was rented in 1917, to a gentleman around 40 years old, who had a long brown beard and who has as his name Monsieur Frémyet. Therefore this gentleman lived in this house for a good part of the summer of 1917 with a woman of about 45 to 50, or more exactly 47, with blue eyes and chestnut hair, medium height."

The mayor denied any knowledge of Célestine Buisson or a man called Frémyet living at the Maison (or Villa) Tric. This claim was well short of the truth, because the mayor recognized the man described accurately by Lacoste by another of Landru's aliases: "Raoul Dupont". The mayor did, however, put Lacoste in touch with Victorine Pellat, the younger sister of Landru's sixth known victim Anna Collomb, who had made an identical inquiry about Collomb in 1917.

Lacoste contacted Pellat and after conferring about their separate investigations, they filed two missing person complaints with the prosecutor's office in the department of Seine-et-Oise, where Gambais was located. By a desultory route, the cases finally wound their way back to Inspector Jules Belin of the Paris flying squad (brigade mobile).

Belin interviewed Pellat and Lacoste and then plagiarized most of the latter's research for an internal police report in which he falsely took the credit for Landru's arrest. In reality, Landru's capture was entirely due to a chance sighting of him on 11 April 1919 by Lacoste's friend Laure Bonhoure as he was shopping with his mistress Fernande Segret in a crockery shop on Rue de Rivoli. Bonhoure tried to follow Landru after he left the shop, but fearing he had recognized her, she ran home to tell Lacoste, who phoned Belin with the news. Belin retrieved the business card that Landru, alias "Lucien Guillet", had given to a shop assistant and visited the address indicated: 76 Rue de Rochechouart, near the Gare du Nord. However, Belin only had an arrest warrant for a man called "Frémyet", so decided to go home for the night.

On 12 April, at around midday, Belin returned with two fellow officers and a newly-drafted warrant and arrested Landru, who had just returned from accosting a woman on the metro.

Investigation (April 1919 – November 1921) 

From the moment of his arrest, when he refused to confirm his identity, Landru was a formidably obdurate suspect. During multiple interrogations in 1919 and 1920, he repeatedly protested his innocence, demanding to know why he would have killed the women when they were his "friends".

The investigating magistrate Gabriel Bonin was initially confident that he could wrap up the case in a matter of days, following the discovery on 29 April 1919 of some tiny fragments of charred human bone debris beneath a pile of leaves in Landru's back garden at Gambais. However, this material was more problematic than it first appeared. Gradually, Bonin's inquiry was enmeshed in a series of interlocking, seemingly insoluble puzzles.

Evidence of murder
In the weeks after Landru's arrest, the police gathered overwhelming proof that Landru had stolen the financial assets and possessions of the 10 missing women on the list in his carnet. Landru had kept the booty he had not sold at a garage in Clichy and various storage depots around Paris, along with files on dozens of women he had contacted during the war via lonely hearts advertisements and matrimonial agencies.

What the police lacked was direct evidence of murder, apart from the charred bone debris discovered at Gambais; and under the microscope, these fragments turned out to be "a veritable puzzle", according to Dr Charles Paul, the director of the Paris police laboratory. Paul and his colleagues were only able to establish that the debris had come from three or more skeletons. They did not know if the skeletons were female, because there were no pelvic bones; nor could the forensic scientists confirm that the fragments came from three or more of the women who were known to have vanished at Gambais.

Although Paul avoided speculation in his report on the debris, it was possible that the fragments came from the burnt skeletons of other unknown victims whom Landru had killed at the Villa Tric. This possibility was reinforced by the evidence of one witness in particular, an army doctor who had seen Landru dumping a heavy package in a pond near Gambais in the late spring or early summer of 1916. The doctor did not testify at Landru's trial, pleading illness, but the prosecution acknowledged that his sighting did not fit the timeline of the known disappearances; about six months after the presumed murder of Landru's fifth known fiancée and six months before the death of the next victim on the charge sheet.

Complicity of Landru's family
To varying degrees, Landru's wife and four children were all complicit in shielding him from the police during the war and in abetting his thefts from the missing women. The unanswered question is whether any, some or all of them were also complicit in his murders.

His youngest son Charles, acted as his self-styled "apprentice" from 1914 to 1919, helping Landru to clear five of the women's apartments after they vanished. Two days after Landru's arrest, Charles also admitted assisting his father with unexplained "gardening work" at Landru's house in Vernouillet in early 1915, around the time that Jeanne and André Cuchet disappeared.

Landru's eldest son Maurice (born in 1894) was arrested for swindling and thefts in the autumn of 1915, shortly after his mobilization, and tried by court martial. Among the valuables in Maurice's possession was jewelry belonging to Jeanne Cuchet which Landru had given him. Maurice later disclaimed any knowledge of the jewelry's provenance. In January 1917, following his release from a military prison, Maurice assisted his father in creating a cover story to explain the disappearance of the sixth missing woman, Anna Collomb.

Landru's wife Marie Catherine forged at least one of the missing women's signatures so Landru could gain access to his victim's bank savings. Under interrogation, Marie Catherine initially protested her innocence, claiming her only crime had been "to love my husband too much". She eventually confessed, while insisting that she had had no idea why Landru had asked her to commit the forgery.

The complicity of Landru's two daughters, Marie (born 1891) and Suzanne (born 1896), was less certain. Marie disclaimed any knowledge of his activities during the war, even though in August 1917 she had bid unsuccessfully at a property auction in Gambais on Landru's behalf for a house in which he was interested. Suzanne moved out of the family's apartment in 1916 when she became engaged, but still saw Landru at intervals on her visits back home.

In December 1919 the investigating magistrate Bonin ordered the arrest of Landru's wife and Maurice Landru on suspicion of complicity in Landru's thefts and frauds. However, Bonin never formally charged them and in July 1920 they were released from custody – in Marie-Catherine's case on medical grounds (she had a bad back) and in Maurice's case because according to Bonin, his continuing detention was not helpful to the investigation. It appears more likely that Bonin decided a jury would struggle to believe that Marie-Catherine and Maurice had known nothing about the murders, given their clear involvement in Landru's thefts. This is also the most plausible explanation for why Bonin never arrested Landru's youngest son and "apprentice" Charles.

Flaws in the case
In December Bonin finally submitted his case against Landru (drafted by another lawyer because of Bonin's other commitments). His central premise was that all the murders had occurred in identical circumstances and for the same motive: financial gain. In Bonin's narrative, Landru was a serial killer who had acted alone, murdering his victims after he had stolen their assets, to prevent them from reporting him to the police.

The case was riddled with flaws. In particular:
Bank records proved that the first woman to disappear, Jeanne Cuchet, had been almost broke. Furthermore, Landru had been loaded with cash from his latest swindle when he had met Jeanne. It was he who had subsidized her.
Most of the other nine women ranged from poor to almost destitute. Only three women (Marie-Angélique Guillin, Anna Collomb and Célestine Buisson) had possessed substantial savings.

Bonin's assessment of Landru's psychiatric state was also contradictory. On the one hand, Bonin's submission declared that Landru was a human monster who was endowed with a "savage energy". On the other hand, Bonin determined that Landru was "not at all deranged" and therefore mentally fit to stand trial. Bonin based his conclusion on the diagnosis of the same three psychiatrists who had first examined Landru in 1904 and found him "on the frontiers of madness". In 1920, the doctors revised their opinion, maintaining that Landru was "entirely normal" and responsible for his actions. They produced no substantive clinical evidence to support their new diagnosis, which was possibly the result of pressure from Bonin to bring Landru to trial rather than send him to an asylum.

Trial (7 – 30 November 1921) 

Landru was eventually brought to trial in Versailles in November 1921, after exhausting his appeals against previous convictions. The location was a compromise between the authorities in the department of Seine-et-Oise (now Yvelines), where Landru had allegedly committed the murders, and the judiciary in Paris, where his victims had lived. Versailles was chosen as the venue as the largest town in Seine-et-Oise, while the presiding judge, Maurice Gilbert, was from the Paris judiciary.
Gilbert allowed photographers to take pictures during each session, a decision which helped to stoke the sensational atmosphere surrounding the long-awaited trial of the "Bluebeard of Gambais". Every day, the newspapers gave saturation coverage of the proceedings and as the trial progressed, and the possibility of Landru's acquittal on the murder charges seemed to increase, the proceedings attracted trainloads of spectators from Paris. Celebrities who came to watch Landru included the reigning queen of French musical theater, Mistinguett, the actors Maurice Chevalier and Sacha Guitry, the writer Rudyard Kipling (in Paris to receive an honorary degree) and the novelist Colette (who covered the first session for the newspaper Le Matin). By the end of the trial, Gilbert had lost all control of the audience, with as many as 500 spectators crammed inside, double the courtroom's capacity.

The defense and prosecution cases
Landru's 43-year-old defense attorney Vincent de Moro Giafferri, widely regarded as the most famous trial lawyer in France, privately despised his client and thought he was insane. However, Moro was also a passionate opponent of the death penalty and did not believe that the prosecution could remotely prove that Landru had certainly killed the 10 women and one young man on the murder charge sheet. Moro therefore proposed to offer the jury a bargain. The defense would not contest the multiple charges of theft and fraud (even though Landru denied them), which would be enough to send Landru for the rest of his life into exile with hard labor in French Guiana – an ordeal which would probably kill him before long, given Landru's poor physical health.

In constructing this defense, Moro's chief difficulty was keeping Landru under control and preferably silent. Under examination, Landru repeatedly made clear that he knew more about the fate of the women than he was prepared to reveal, ostensibly because he had had a "sacred compact" with them which swore him to silence. Adding to the impression of his guilt, Landru argued ludicrously that he had pursued the women via lonely hearts advertisements as a means to gain access to their furniture, which he had wanted to sell. He denied that any of them had been his mistresses and insisted that the incriminating list of names in his notebook was merely a record of his clients.

Moro's best chance of saving Landru from the guillotine lay in the overall weakness of the murder case. As Moro argued, none of the 157 witnesses on the prosecution's list (about 120 of whom were called) had any direct evidence of murder. All the mothers, sisters and female friends of the missing women could produce was proof of Landru's trickery of their loved ones, which the defense did not dispute. Moro ridiculed the incompetence of the police, who had failed to seal Landru's property at Gambais after their first search of the house and gardens, when they had not discovered the bone debris. In Moro's view, it was possible that the debris had been planted by persons unknown before the second search, in order to incriminate Landru.

The chief prosecuting attorney Robert Godefroy, a plodding government barrister, struggled from the start of the trial to make any headway with Landru, or prevent Moro undermining the credibility of the police and forensic witnesses. Gilbert, the judge, effectively took over the examination of Landru, as he was entitled to do under the French judicial system. Yet while Gilbert scored some palpable hits against Landru – in particular, regarding the records in his notebook – the consensus among reporters covering the trial was that the outcome would depend on the closing speeches by Godefroy and Moro.

Godefroy was suffering from flu, forcing him to break off his marathon address on the first day and complete it the following afternoon. He itemized eight "proofs" which in his view demonstrated Landru's guilt beyond all doubt, from the one-way train tickets Landru had bought the women on their last known journey to Gambais to the killer's tell-tale noting of the hour they disappeared – "the hour of the execution".

In a brilliant tour de force, Moro set about demolishing every shred of supposed certainty in the case. Yet even Moro could not explain away the sinister fact that none of the women had surfaced following Landru's arrest. Instead, Moro fell back on a lurid scenario where Landru had been a pimp who had dispatched the women abroad into the "white slave trade". To support his argument, Moro claimed that all the women had been in some sense estranged from their families, an allegation that was demonstrably untrue in several cases, and arguable in several others.

The verdict
The jury's verdict, delivered on the evening of 30 November 1921 after three hours deliberation, was not straightforward. By a majority of nine to three they found Landru guilty of all 11 murders on the charge sheet. Separately, the jury unanimously convicted Landru of all the counts of theft and fraud, apart from those concerning a teenaged girl who had been destitute.
In the mayhem that followed the verdict, Moro instantly added to the confusion by persuading all twelve jurors to sign Landru's pre-drafted appeal for clemency. If the appeal was successful, the sentence would be commuted to transportation with hard labor. However, Landru refused to sign the document on the grounds that he was entirely innocent. "The tribunal has made a mistake", he told the court before being led back to his cell. "I have never killed anyone. This is my final protest."

Execution and aftermath 

Landru was eventually persuaded by Moro to sign his clemency appeal, which was rejected by President Alexandre Millerand. Just before his execution, his final request was for a foot bath. He was executed by guillotine just before dawn on 25 February 1922 outside the gates of the Prison Saint-Pierre in Versailles. The whole procedure from Landru walking out of prison to his beheading took approximately 20 seconds. Landru's corpse was then buried in a marked grave in the nearby Cimetière des Gonards. Five years later his remains were disinterred and reburied in an unmarked grave in the same cemetery when his family declined to renew the lease on the burial site. 
Landru's severed head eventually found its way into the Museum of Death, in Hollywood, California.

In the 1930s Landru's house at Gambais was converted into a restaurant which traded on his notoriety. The house still stands and in 2017 was put up for sale. Landru's notorious oven, in which he allegedly burnt the remains of his victims, was sold at auction in 1923 to a businessman who wanted to put it on display in the Italian city of Turin, beyond French jurisdiction. The Turin authorities banned the exhibition and the oven disappeared from public view, possibly acquired by another private collector.
In 1968 a sketch of the oven that Landru had drawn during the trial and entrusted to Moro's deputy counsel was produced by the lawyer's daughter. Beside the oven, Landru had written: "One can burn anything one wants in there", a remark attributed to him by a woman who had survived a visit to the house. On the back of the sketch, Landru had written: "This demonstrates the stupidity of the witnesses. Nothing happened in front of the wall, but in the house." The meaning of Landru's statement is unclear.

In fiction

The two most famous films that are based on Landru bear little relation to the original case. In 1947, Charlie Chaplin played the title role in Monsieur Verdoux, a black comedy about a bank clerk who loses his job and murders 14 affluent women to support his family. Chaplin adapted an original script by Orson Welles about Landru, which Chaplin then bought.

Claude Chabrol's French-language Landru (1963), from a script by the novelist Françoise Sagan, ignored the first four murders at Vernouillet and recast the remaining women as fashionable and attractive. Chabrol was sued for defamation by Landru's last mistress Fernande Segret, who disapproved of her portrayal in the film by the actress Stéphane Audran. Segret received modest damages and retired to a care home in the town of Flers, where she committed suicide in 1968.

In 1963, in The Twilight Zone episode "The New Exhibit", depicts Landru as a wax figure who commits murder. He is portrayed by the American actor Milton Parsons.

See also
 List of French serial killers

Select bibliography 
Bardens, Dennis, The Ladykiller: The Crimes of Landru, the French Bluebeard, P. Davies, London, 1972.
Belin, J., Commissaire Belin. Trente Ans de Sûreté Nationale, Bibliothèque FranceSoir, Paris, 1950.
Béraud, Henri, Bourcier, Emmanuel & Salmon, André, L'Affaire Landru, Albin Michel, Paris, 1924.
Bernède, Arthur, Landru, Jules Tallandier, Paris, 1931.
Biagi-Chai, Francesca, Le cas Landru à la lumière de la psychoanalyse, Imago, Paris, 2007.
Darmon, Pierre, Landru, Plon, Paris, 1994.
González, Christian, Monsieur Landru, Scènes de Crimes, Paris, 2007.
Jaeger, Gérard, Landru: bourreau des cœurs, L'Archipel, Paris, 2005.
Lanzalavi, Dominique, Vincent de Moro Giafferri: Défendre l'homme, toujours, Ajaccio, Albiana, 2011.
Le Queux, William, Landru: His Secret Love Affairs, Stanley Paul & Co., London, 1922.
Mackenzie, F.A. (editor), Landru, Geoffrey Bles, London, 1928.
Masson, René, Landru, le Barbe-Bleue de Gambais, N'Avouez Jamais, Paris, 1974.
Michal, Bernard, Les Monstres, Bibliomnibus, Paris, 2014.
Sagnier, Christine, L'Affaire Landru, Editions de Vecchi, Paris, 1999.
Tomlinson, Richard, Landru's Secret: The Deadly Seductions of France's Lonely Hearts Serial Killer, Pen & Sword, Yorkshire and Philadelphia, 2018.
Wakefield, Herbert Russell, Landru, The French Bluebeard, Duckworth, London, 1936.
Yung, Eric, Landru: 6h 10 Temps Clair, Editions Télémaque, Paris, 2013.

References

External links
 Biography

1869 births
1922 deaths
20th-century French criminals
Burials at the Cimetière des Gonards
Criminals from Paris
Executed French serial killers
Executed people from Île-de-France
French fraudsters
Male serial killers
Murder convictions without a body
People executed by France by guillotine
People executed by the French Third Republic